Edmund Mudrak (27 October 1894 – 12 December 1965) was an Austrian philologist who specialized in Germanic studies.

Biography
Edmund Mudrak was born in Vienna, Austria-Hungary on 27 October 1894. He studied German, Oriental studies and prehistory at the University of Vienna, gaining his Ph.D. there under the supervision of Georg Hüsing with a thesis on Wayland the Smith.

He was a prominent member of the  movement. From 1939 to 1943, Mudrak worked for Amt Rosenberg.

After World War II, Mudrak workes as a teacher at the Akademisches Gymnasium in Vienna, and as a consultant at the Old Catholic Church of Austria. Since 1965 he was together with Karl Tekusch Deputy Chairman of the Muttersprache society in Vienna. Mudrak published a number of works on Germanic folklore, Germanic mythology and literature, which have been published in numerous editions up to the present day. He died in Vienna on 12 December 1965.

See also
 Otto Höfler
 Richard Wolfram

Selected works
Mudrak, Edmund (1938). „Die Aufgaben der Volkskunde als einer lebendigen Wissenschaft“. In: Spieß, Karl von & Mudrak, Edmund. Deutsche Volkskunde als politische Wissenschaft. Zwei Aufsätze mit einem vollständigen Verlagsverzeichnis für 1923-1938 als Anhang. Berlin: Stubenrauch. S. 3–11.
Mudrak, Edmund (Hg.) (2003). Sagen der Germanen. 23. Auflage. Eningen: Ensslin.
Mudrak, Edmund (Hg.) (2009a). Deutsche Heldensagen. 36. Auflage. Hamburg: Nikol.
Mudrak, Edmund (Hg.) (2009b). Nordische Götter- und Heldensagen. 28. Auflage. Hamburg: Nikol.
Mudrak, Edmund (1943). „Sagen der Technik“. Hegel & Schade.
Mudrak, Edmund & Spieß, Karl von & Sladky, Herta (Hg.) (1944). Hausbuch deutscher Märchen. Berlin: Stubenrauh.

Sources

Bockhorn, Olaf (1994). „Von Ritualen, Mythen und Lebenskreisen: Volkskunde im Umfeld der Universität Wien“. In: Jacobeit, Wolfgang & Lixfeld, Hannjost (Hg.). Völkische Wissenschaft. Gestalten und Tendenzen der deutschen und österreichischen Volkskunde in der ersten Hälfte des 20. Jahrhunderts. Wien / Köln / Weimar: Böhlau. S. 477–526.
Mehl, Erwin (1966) „Unserem zweiten Obmanne, Univ.-Prof. i. R. Dr. Edmund Mudrak, zum Gedenken“. Nachruf. In: Wiener Sprachblätter 16/1. S. 1.
 Pfalzgraf, Falco (2016). „Karl von Spieß, mit einem Exkurs zu Edmund Mudrak“. In: Pfalzgraf, Falco. Karl Tekusch als Sprachpfleger. Seine Rolle in Wiener Sprachvereinen des 20. Jahrhunderts. Bremen: Hempen. (Greifswalder Beiträge zur Linguistik 10.) S. 44–47.
Popa, Klaus (2010). „Mudrak Edmund (1894-1965)“. In: Popa, Klaus (Hg.). Völkisches Handbuch Südosteuropa. S. 67–68.

1894 births
1970 deaths
Austrian philologists
German folklorists
Germanic studies scholars
People from Vienna
University of Vienna alumni
Writers on Germanic paganism
20th-century philologists